Justice Thomas may refer to:

 Benjamin Thomas (politician), associate justice of the Massachusetts Supreme Judicial Court
 Charles M. Thomas (judge), associate justice of the South Dakota Territorial Supreme Court
 Clarence Thomas (born 1948), associate justice of the Supreme Court of the United States
 Darwin W. Thomas, associate justice of the Supreme Court of Idaho
 Edward A. Thomas (1838–1890), associate justice of the Territorial Wyoming Supreme Court
 Elwood L. Thomas, associate justice of the Supreme Court of Missouri
 Elwyn Thomas (1894–1971), associate justice of the Supreme Court of Florida
 James Burrows Thomas (born 1935), judge on the Supreme Court of Queensland
 Jesse B. Thomas Jr., associate justice of the Supreme Court of Illinois
 John Charles Thomas (judge) (born c. 1950), associate justice of the Supreme Court of Virginia
 John Lilburn Thomas, associate justice of the Supreme Court of Missouri
 John Thomas, Baron Thomas of Cwmgiedd (born 1947), Lord Justice of Appeal of the Court of Appeal of England and Wales
 K. T. Thomas (judge) (born 1937), judge of the Supreme Court of India
 Richard V. Thomas (1932–2010), associate justice of the Supreme Court of Wyoming
 Robert R. Thomas (born 1952), associate justice of the Supreme Court of Illinois
 William H. Thomas (Alabama judge), associate justice of the Alabama Supreme Court
 William H. Thomas (Maryland judge), judge of the Maryland Court of Appeals

See also
Judge Thomas (disambiguation)